Tafea is the southernmost of the six provinces of Vanuatu.

The name is an acronym for the five main islands that make up the province: Tanna, Aneityum, Futuna, Erromango and Aniwa.

History

Unlike the other provinces of Vanuatu, the territorial integrity of this administrative unit has been unchanged since the times of the Condominium, when it was called Southern District, or Tanna after the main island. Only the capital moved from Lenakel to nearby Isangel, less than two kilometers more southeast.

A secessionist movement began in the 1970s, and the Nation of Tanna was proclaimed on 24 March 1974. While the British were more open to allowing its holdings in Vanuatu independence, it was opposed by the French colonists and finally suppressed by the Anglo-French Condominium authorities on 29 June 1974.

In 1980, there was another attempt to secede, declaring the Tafea Nation on 1 January 1980, its name coming from the initials of the five islands that were to be part of the nation (Tanna, Aniwa, Futuna, Erromango and Aneityum). British forces intervened on 26 May 1980, allowing the islands to become part of the newly independent nation of Vanuatu on 30 July 1980.

Geography

The province has a population of 32,540 people and an area of 1,628 km2. The main island, though second to Erromango in area, is Tanna, with some 80 percent of the province population, with the provincial capital of Isangel, and the largest village of Lenakel, both close together on the southwest coast.

The three larger islands are Melanesian, but the smaller two, Aniwa and Futuna, also known under the collective term Erronan Islands, are Polynesian outliers. Futuna is sometimes called West Futuna to distinguish it from Futuna Island, Wallis and Futuna.

The island of Tanna has the world's most accessible volcano, Mount Yasur, with 1,084 meters the highest peak of the province. Aniwa Island is the only coral island, the other four are volcanic and reach much higher elevations than Aniwa.

Anatom is the southernmost island of Vanuatu (not counting the remote, tiny and uninhabited Matthew and Hunter Islands,  to the southeast, which are disputed with New Caledonia, but which are considered by the people of Anatom Island part of their custom ownership). Its southeastern cape Nétchan Néganneaing is the southernmost point of land in Vanuatu, more southerly than the southern satellite islet Inyeug. The latter, however, is surrounded Intao Reef, that extends even further south, albeit submerged, thus being the southernmost feature of Vanuatu.

Islands

References

Citations

Footnotes

External links

 
Provinces of Vanuatu
States and territories established in 1994
Former unrecognized countries
Former countries in Oceania
Island countries